My Mother the Car is an American fantasy comedy that aired for a single season on NBC between September 14, 1965 and April 5, 1966. Thirty episodes were produced by United Artists Television. The premise features a man whose deceased mother is reincarnated as an antique car, who communicates with him through the car radio.

Critics and adult viewers generally disliked the show, often savagely. In 2002, TV Guide proclaimed it to be the second-worst of all time, behind The Jerry Springer Show. TV Land's first day of programming in April 1996 included the series premiere as a collection of television firsts and rarities, billing it as "the strange but true...infamous series". The show's premise was similar to other popular comedies of the 1960s that featured a fantastic gimmick, such as a talking horse (Mister Ed), a suburbanite witch (Bewitched), an obedient genie (I Dream of Jeannie), or a flying nun (The Flying Nun).

My Mother the Car had an experienced production team with established comedy credentials. Rod Amateau had produced The George Burns and Gracie Allen Show and The Many Loves of Dobie Gillis. Allan Burns had written for Jay Ward and went on to create several critically acclaimed shows, including The Mary Tyler Moore Show, Rhoda, and Lou Grant. Television producer James L. Brooks created Room 222 and Taxi, and served as executive producer of The Simpsons. Chris Hayward produced and wrote for Barney Miller during its first several seasons.

Synopsis
The show follows the exploits of attorney David Crabtree (played by Jerry Van Dyke) who, while shopping at a used-car lot for a station wagon to serve as a second family car, instead purchases a dilapidated 1928 Porter touring car. Crabtree hears the car call his name in a woman's voice. The car turns out to be the reincarnation of his deceased mother, Gladys (voiced by Ann Sothern). She talks (only to Crabtree) through the car's radio: the dial light flashes in synchronization with "Mother's" voice. In an effort to get his family to accept the old, tired car, Crabtree brings it to a custom body shop for a full restoration. The car is coveted by a fanatical collector named Captain Manzini (Avery Schreiber), but Crabtree purchases and restores the car before Manzini can acquire it.

For the rest of the series, Crabtree is pursued by the avaricious Captain Manzini, who is determined to acquire the valuable automobile by hook or by crook. In a running gag characterizing his shifty nature, Manzini (who resembles a 1920s silent film villain) always mangles Crabtree's name when speaking to him. "Now, then, Crabapple..." "That's Crabtree." "Whatever."

Others in the cast included Maggie Pierce as wife Barbara, Cindy Eilbacher (the sister of Lisa Eilbacher) and Randy Whipple as the kids, Cindy and Randy. Veteran movie and television character actors played supporting roles, including Bill Daily, Harold Peary, Byron Foulger, Bob Jellison, Sam Flint, and Willis Bouchey.

Production notes
The show was created by Allan Burns and Chris Hayward, who had better success with Rocky & Bullwinkle, The Munsters, and Get Smart (which debuted the same season).  Aluminum Model Toys (AMT), a well-known producer of plastic model car kits, introduced a 1/25-scale kit of the Porter in late 1965.

The theme music was composed and conducted by Ralph Carmichael. It was written and sung by Paul Hampton.  It was used on an episode of Arrested Development also called "My Mother, the Car".

The show began with a black-and-white pilot, which was later refilmed in color. This pilot did not originally air, but has been shown several times on Canadian television. Network censors insisted that one particular scene be deleted where the car backfired.

Car
The on-set car, called a 1928 Porter Stanhope touring car, was a custom car, rebuilt by Norm Grabowski, from a 1924 Ford Model T, and later restyled by property master Kaye Trapp and Norm Breedlove. A stunt car, driven by a rear-floorboard-hidden driver, was built by George Barris, as a replica.

The on-set car used in My Mother the Car, was, in 2016, located in Edmonton, Alberta, Canada and owned by Dave Bodnar. The stunt car was once owned by casino giant William Harrah, who had one of the largest special-interest and antique auto collections of all time in Reno, Nevada. After Harrah's death in 1984, the auction catalogue advertised the lot as having a carnation red body with white top and created from parts of a Ford Model T, a Maxwell, a Hudson and a Chevrolet. (The actual Porter Motor Company existed only in 1900-1901.)  Harrah's F.R.P. is, since 1994, at the Seal Cove Auto Museum on Mount Desert Island in Maine. As of 2012 the stunt Porter is located at the Star Cars Museum in Gatlinburg, Tennessee. On September 3, 2017, the car sold at the Dragone auction, part of the Historic Festival 35 at Lime Rock Park in Lakeville, CT for $50,000.

Soundtrack
The series was scored by Ralph Carmichael with the lyrics of the title song by Paul Hampton. Sammy Davis Jr. did a cover version.

Cast
Jerry Van Dyke as Dave Crabtree
Maggie Pierce as Barbara Crabtree (née Netwick)
Ann Sothern as Mother the 1928 Porter (formerly Gladys Crabtree (née Brown))
Avery Schreiber as Captain Bernard Manzini
Cindy Eilbacher as Cindy Crabtree
Randy Whipple as Randy Crabtree
Paula Winslowe as Grandma Netwick

Episodes

Release
In the United Kingdom the series debuted on ITV on 8 November 1965.

Ownership status
The current owner of the show is Metro-Goldwyn-Mayer, which bought United Artists in 1981.

Home media
TGG Direct released a DVD box set of the series on 12 November 2013. It contains the 30 episodes that aired, but not the unaired pilot. The laugh track has been removed for the DVD set.

All 30 episodes were available for viewing on Hulu. The show is also available on MGM's YouTube channel.

Syndication
Antenna TV began airing episodes of the show on September 19, 2015.

References

External links
 

1965 American television series debuts
1966 American television series endings
1960s American sitcoms
English-language television shows
American fantasy television series
American supernatural television series
Automotive television series
Television series about ghosts
NBC original programming
Television series about families
Television series by United Artists Television
Television shows about reincarnation